Sky Meteo 24 is the first Italian television channel dedicated exclusively to weather forecasts, it was launched on 1 August 2004, owned by Sky Italia. It airs quarter-hourly full forecasts.

Products during bulletin

Logos

References

External links 
Sky Meteo24 on sky.it 

Sky Italia
Italian-language television stations
Television channels and stations established in 2004
Television channels in Italy